James Lee House may refer to:

James Lee House (239 Adams Avenue, Memphis), Tennessee, listed on the National Register of Historic Places (NRHP) in Shelby County
James Lee House (690 Adams Avenue, Memphis), Tennessee, also known as the Harsson-Goyer-Lee House and operated as a business called "James Lee House," also listed on the NRHP
James H. Lee House in the Monroe Residential Historic District (Monroe, North Carolina)

See also
Lee House (disambiguation)
James Lee (disambiguation)
James House (disambiguation)